Helvella costifera is a species of fungus in the family Helvellaceae, Pezizales order. Its ascocarp has conspicuous ribs on its undersurface.

Distribution
This species has been found in China, Europe (Spain), and North America (including Mexico), where it is widely distributed.

References

costifera
Fungi described in 1953
Fungi of Asia
Fungi of Europe
Fungi of North America